The  is a private museum established in October 1964 in Tokyo, Japan.

History 

The first museum director, Hatakeyama Issē (28 December 1881 - 17 November 1971）was the founder of Ebara Corporation. In 1937, Hatakeyama purchased the landlot once Count Terashima Munenori resided, and relocated and rebuilt an old guest house from Hannyaji in Nara which he named "Hannyaen", where a house warming tea ceremony was held in 1943. As Hatakeyama practiced Hōshō school noh since he was young, he acquired a private noh theater and reassembled on the property. There are noh costumes among the collection.

Hatakeyama's collection was moved to a museum he built in 1964 next to his residence as he planned to preserve it for many years and hold exhibitions for the public as well as support researchers. 

There is a tea house called Shō-an in the museum building, and those in the garden are for rent; Sara-an, Sui-an, Meigetsuken, Shin zashiki, Jōrakutei and Bishamondō. Once a year, a guided tour is held to visit those tea houses.

Notable collections 
The museum holds four exhibition each year. Centered on tea utensils, the collection consists of old Japanese, Chinese and Korean works of art such as paintings, calligraphic writings, pottery, lacquer items and Noh costumes. Of the circa 1,300 objects in the collection, 6 are National Treasures and 32 have been designated as Important Cultural Properties of Japan.
National treasures

Letter of Fujiwara no Sukemasa , a National treasure designated as of 28 June 1956. Ink on paper, Japan.
Evening bell from mist-shrouded temple attributed to Muqi Fachang , ink on silk, Southern Song, China.
Painting of Apple blossom attributed to Zhao Chang , painting on silk Southern Song, China.
, ink on paper. Yuan dynasty, China.
Letter of Daie Sōkō (1089–1163) , ink on paper. Southern Song, China.
Box with butterfly inlay , lacquar ware with mother-of-pearl inlay. Kamakura period, Japan.

Important Cultural Property

Bokuseki of Yuanwu Keqin, 12 February 1128, an Important Cultural Property designated on 25 May 1939. 
Bokuseki of Nanso Shisetsu, Fall, 1342 
 Portrait of Hideyoshi Toyotomi on silk cloth, an Important Cultural Property  designated on 6 May 1936.  With legend dated August 1598.

Tea cups
"Kōshin" Koido jawan 
"Denchū" Ao idojawan 
Amamori-jawan 
Nicknamed "Matsudaira kohiki" Kohiki-jawan 

Painting
Kiyotaki gongen gazō 
Decorative art
Handscroll of "Kokin Wakashū", with design of flowers of four seasons

References

Further reading 

Tea museums
Art museums and galleries in Tokyo